W. Edmund Livingstone was an English footballer who played as a full back for South Kirkby and Sheffield United.

Playing career
Livingstone began his football career with South Kirkby before joining Sheffield United in August 1910 after a successful trial. In signing Livingstone, Sheffield United beat off interest from many clubs, most notably from Huddersfield Town.

References

Date of death missing
English footballers
Association football defenders
South Kirkby Colliery F.C. players
Sheffield United F.C. players
Year of birth missing